Băneasa is a commune in Galați County, Western Moldavia, Romania with a population of 2,167 people. It is composed of two villages, Băneasa and Roșcani.

References

Communes in Galați County
Localities in Western Moldavia